Vyacheslav Ryabov (born 21 June 1989) is a Ukrainian professional footballer who plays as a midfielder for Kryvbas Kryvyi Rih.

Career
Born in Kryvyi Rih, Dnipropetrovsk Oblast, Ukrainian SSR, Ryabov is a product of his native FC Kryvbas Kryvyi Rih Youth Sportive School.

He signed contract with FC Kryvbas in 2007, but made only one appearance in the Ukrainian Premier League, as substituted player in the game against FC Dnipro Dnipropetrovsk on 16 May 2009. Then he played for football clubs in the Ukrainian Second League or in the Ukrainian First League.

References

External links
 
 

1989 births
Living people
Sportspeople from Kryvyi Rih
Ukrainian footballers
Association football midfielders
FC Hirnyk Kryvyi Rih players
FC Kolos Kovalivka players
FC Kryvbas Kryvyi Rih players
Ukrainian Premier League players
Ukrainian First League players
Ukrainian Second League players
IV liga players
Ukrainian expatriate footballers
Expatriate footballers in Poland
Ukrainian expatriate sportspeople in Poland